is a Japanese competitive figure skater. He is the 2006 Four Continents champion, a four-time Grand Prix Final medalist (silver in 2009 and 2010; bronze in 2006 and 2013), the 2005 World Junior champion and the 2008 Japanese national champion.

Personal life 
Oda introduces himself as a direct descendant of Oda Nobunaga, a daimyō during Japan's Sengoku period who conquered most of Japan.

In April 2010, Oda married his longtime girlfriend, Mayu, and their son, Shintaro, was born on October 1, 2010. Originally scheduled for April 23, 2011, the wedding was postponed due to the rescheduling of the World Championships. Their second son was born on January 5, 2013. A third son was born in early autumn of 2016, and a daughter on October 22, 2019.

Oda has expressed interest in becoming a school teacher following the end of his skating career.

Career 
Oda trained in Osaka, Japan with Noriko Oda and in Barrie, Ontario with Lee Barkell. He trained in Canada three or four times a year for 1½ months at a time, at the Mariposa School of Skating. He also formerly trained in Hackensack, New Jersey under coach Nikolai Morozov. Oda is known for his jumps and his smooth flow across the ice with deep knee bend.

Early career 
In the 2001–2002 season, Oda placed 4th at the Japan Junior Championships. He was invited to compete at the senior Japan Championships, where he placed 16th.

Oda made his Junior Grand Prix debut on the 2002–2003 ISU Junior Grand Prix circuit. He won the silver medal in Slovakia behind Russian Alexander Shubin, who would go on to win the Junior Grand Prix Final that season. Oda finished 7th at the event in Italy. He won the bronze medal at Japan Junior Championships and was invited to the senior Japan Championships, where he placed 4th.

In the 2003–2004 season, Oda won two medals on the 2003–2004 Junior Grand Prix and qualified for his first and only time to the Junior Grand Prix Final, where he placed 8th. He placed 2nd at Junior Championships and qualified for the team to the 2004 World Junior Championships, where he placed 11th. He placed 5th at the Japan Championships.

In the 2004–2005 season, Oda again competed on the 2004–2005 Junior Grand Prix circuit and won the bronze medal in Ukraine behind compatriot Yasuharu Nanri and American Dennis Phan, both of whom would go on to medal at the Junior Grand Prix Final. Oda won the Japan Junior Championships and won the bronze medal at Japan Championships. He went on to win the 2005 World Junior Championships.

2005–2007: Senior international debut 
Oda turned senior for the 2005-2006 Olympic year, when he was guaranteed a senior Grand Prix assignment after he won the World Junior Championships. Oda made a splash immediately as a senior, winning the bronze medal at his first event and winning the 2005 NHK Trophy over favorites Daisuke Takahashi and reigning world bronze medalist Evan Lysacek. Oda qualified for the 2005–2006 Grand Prix Final and placed fourth.

Oda was proclaimed the winner of the Japan Championships ahead of Takahashi, until a glitch in the computer software was discovered and he fell to second place; he had done too many combinations. The Japanese federation decided to split the international assignments between Oda and declared-winner Daisuke Takahashi, sending Oda to the 2006 World Championships, and Takahashi to the Olympics, in as much as Japan had only one spot for each competition after the withdrawal of Takeshi Honda from the 2005 World Championships and Takahashi's 15th-place finish at that competition. Oda placed fourth at his first World Championships, earning Japan two spots to the 2007 Worlds.

The following season, Oda placed 1st at 2006 Skate America over American Evan Lysacek, and he finished 2nd at the 2006 NHK Trophy to compatriot Daisuke Takahashi. He qualified for the Grand Prix Final and won the bronze medal. At the Japan Championships, Oda won the silver medal for the second consecutive year. He went on to compete at the 2007 Winter Universiade in Torino, Italy, where he won the silver. At the 2007 World Championships, held in Tokyo, Oda once again performed too many combinations and placed 7th overall.

Arrest 
On July 26, 2007, Oda was arrested by the Osaka prefectural police for driving his moped under the influence of alcohol. Oda apologized for this infraction. Due to this incident, Oda was promptly removed from the cast of an upcoming ice show in Japan.

On August 2, 2007, the Japan Skating Federation, itself wracked by scandal, announced that it had suspended Oda from national competition until the end of October and from international competition and exhibitions until the end of December, effectively withdrawing him from his two Grand Prix assignments (Skate Canada and Trophée Eric Bompard), while allowing him to compete at Nationals and try to earn a spot to the 2008 World Championships. The federation also sentenced Oda to perform community service. Oda accepted the punishment meted out by the federation, and paid the fine of ¥100,000.

2008–2010: Vancouver Olympics 
After sitting out the 2007–2008 Grand Prix season, Oda announced his withdrawal from the Japan Championships on December 24, 2007, citing mental stress.

Oda switched coaches to Nikolai Morozov in the spring of 2008. He began the 2008–2009 season at the 2008 Nebelhorn Trophy, which he won. He went on to the 2008 Karl Schäfer Memorial, which he also won. Oda was assigned to the 2008 NHK Trophy, and won that as well. Oda was not eligible for a second Grand Prix assignment and therefore could not qualify for the Grand Prix Final.

Oda won at the Japan Championships in December 2008. He, thus, qualified for the 2009 Four Continents and the 2009 World Championships, where he finished 4th and 7th respectively. He landed his only quad (toe) of the season at Worlds.

Oda was assigned to the 2009 Trophée Eric Bompard and to the 2009 Cup of China in the 2009-2010 Grand Prix season, winning both. He was the top qualifier for the Grand Prix Final, where he claimed the silver medal behind Evan Lysacek. At the 2010 Japanese National Championships Oda won the silver medal behind Daisuke Takahashi. That placement earned him a spot to compete at the 2010 Winter Olympics and the 2010 World Championships.

At the 2010 Winter Olympics, Oda scored 84.85 in the short program. In the free skate, he experienced a fall resulting from a broken lace, and was given three minutes to fix his boot with a two-point penalty. Upon resuming the long program, Oda landed a final double Axel and scored 153.69 in that segment of the event, ultimately placing 7th overall in men's singles. Oda then moved on to the 2010 World Championships, where he was considered a medal contender. However, he had a short program in which he performed only single jumps and thus failed to qualify for the free skating portion of the event.

Oda left his coach, Nikolai Morozov, at the end of the 2009–10 season, returning to former coach Lee Barkell.

2010–2014 
For the 2010–11 Grand Prix season, Oda was assigned to the 2010 Skate Canada International and to the 2010 Skate America. He won the silver medal at both events, finishing behind Patrick Chan at Skate Canada and Daisuke Takahashi at Skate America. He qualified for the 2010–11 Grand Prix Final where he won the silver medal. At the 2011 World Championships, he was second after the short program but dropped to sixth overall after the long program in which he did an extra triple toe, resulting in a loss of about 13 points.

In May 2011, Oda was diagnosed with a partial tear of his left patella tendon in his left knee, requiring six weeks of complete rest.

Oda began the next season at 2011 Cup of China, winning the silver medal. He was 7th at 2011 Trophee Eric Bompard. He withdrew from his national championships due to his left knee injury. No surgery was required but he needed time to heal. He was subsequently not named to the team for the 2012 World Championships.

Oda began the 2012–2013 season by winning gold at the 2012 Nebelhorn Trophy. He went on to win the bronze medal at 2012 Skate America and placed fifth at 2012 Rostelecom Cup. This did not qualify him for the Grand Prix Final. He went on to place fourth at Nationals, and thus was not named to the 2013 World Championships team. He went on to compete at the Bavarian Open, which he won.

In 2013–2014, Oda started off his season once again at the Nebelhorn Trophy, winning the title for the second straight year. During the Grand Prix series, he took bronze at the 2013 Skate Canada and silver at the 2013 NHK Trophy. He was named first alternate to the Grand Prix Final, and was called up when his fellow countryman and the defending champion, Daisuke Takahashi, pulled out due to a leg injury. Oda won the bronze medal after placing third in both segments of the competition.

Oda finished fourth at the 2014 Japanese Nationals and was named to the 2014 Four Continents team, but not to the Olympic team. Shortly afterward, Oda announced his retirement from competitive skating.

Post–competitive career 
After his eligible figure skating career, Oda became a professional skater and a TV personality. He voiced himself for a cameo appearance in the 2016 figure skating anime series Yuri on Ice.

In October 2017, Oda announced a desire to retire from official competitions, considering the 2017 Japan Open as the final one. At the Japan Open, he executed a quadruple toe loop-triple toe loop jump combination and a second quadruple toe loop jump with positive grades of execution. Oda is also a recurring cast member at the annual touring ice show Fantasy on Ice. In the 2016 edition of the show he performed a live music version of his short program "Storm" from the 2010–11 season in collaboration with the Yoshida Brothers.

Programs

Post–2014

Pre–2014

Competitive highlights

Trivia 
He frequently lost points by executing too many jump combinations during competitions, violating the Zayak rule.

References

External links 

1987 births
Living people
Japanese male single skaters
People from Takatsuki, Osaka
Figure skaters at the 2007 Winter Universiade
Medalists at the 2007 Winter Universiade
Figure skaters at the 2010 Winter Olympics
Olympic figure skaters of Japan
Oda clan
Four Continents Figure Skating Championships medalists
World Junior Figure Skating Championships medalists
Academic staff of Kansai University
Kansai University alumni
Universiade medalists in figure skating
Figure skating commentators
Universiade gold medalists for Japan
Universiade silver medalists for Japan
Competitors at the 2011 Winter Universiade
Fantasy on Ice main cast members